Pioneer P-1 was a failed mission in the Pioneer program. The spacecraft was a 1-meter diameter sphere with a propulsion module, and was to carry a TV camera and magnetic field sensor. It was to be spin-stabilized and was known as a 'paddlewheel' spacecraft.

The spacecraft was intended for launch on an Atlas C-Able rocket, but this vehicle was destroyed on 24 September 1959 in an explosion on its launch pad during a pre-launch static firing. The P-1 spacecraft and an Able IV space engine were not present on the launch vehicle when it exploded, and were later used on the Pioneer P-3 mission.

References

External links 
 Atlas-C Able at Encyclopedia Astronautica
 Able IV information website
 Space Technology Laboratories Documents Archive

Pioneer program